Francisco Montana and Greg Van Emburgh were the defending champions but they competed with different partners that year, Montana with Donald Johnson and Van Emburgh with Shelby Cannon.

Johnson and Montana lost in the second round to Jeff Belloli and Vojtěch Flégl.

Cannon and Van Emburgh lost in the quarterfinals to Libor Pimek and Byron Talbot.

Pimek and Talbot won in the final 7–6, 6–3 against David Adams and Menno Oosting.

Seeds
Champion seeds are indicated in bold text while text in italics indicates the round in which those seeds were eliminated. All eight seeded teams received byes to the second round.

Draw

Final

Top half

Bottom half

References
 1996 EA-Generali Open Doubles Draw

Austrian Open Kitzbühel
1996 ATP Tour